The TVA Cup is a defunct WTA Tour affiliated tennis tournament played in 1995. It was held at the Aichi Prefectural Gymnasium in Nagoya in Japan and was played on indoor carpet courts.

Results

Singles

Doubles

References
 WTA Results Archive

 
Carpet court tennis tournaments
Indoor tennis tournaments
Defunct tennis tournaments in Japan
WTA Tour